Pol Rosell Costa (born 17 August 1991) is a Spanish racing driver currently competing in the SEAT León Eurocup. He previously competed in the TCR International Series.

Racing career
Rosell began his career in 2007 in karting. In 2008 he switched to the Fórmula Júnior FR2.0 Portugal, he finished 3rd in the championship standings that year. That year he also took part in the Portugal Winter Series FR2.0 and Formula Renault 2.0 WEC. He raced in the SEAT Leon Supercopa Spain championship from 2008-2010, finishing 4th in the championship standings in 2010. From 2011-2013 Rosell raced in the International GT Open, Spanish GT Championship and Winter Series by GT Sport, he finished 4th in the championship standings in the International GT Open and Spanish GT Championship in 2013. In July 2015, it was announced that Rosell would make his TCR International Series debut with Liqui Moly Team Engstler driving a Volkswagen Golf TCR.

Racing record

Complete TCR International Series results
(key) (Races in bold indicate pole position) (Races in italics indicate fastest lap)

References

External links
 

1991 births
Living people
Spanish racing drivers
SEAT León Eurocup drivers
TCR International Series drivers
Portuguese Formula Renault 2.0 drivers
Engstler Motorsport drivers